Siron, Ziron, Sinor or Silor is a pasta dish made with yufka, salty yoghurt, butter and garlic. Its name varies from city to city, from region to region. It is shared by Turks, Laz people, and Pontic Greeks.

Regional siron styles
Gümüşhane Sironu
Denizli Sironu
Giresun Sironu

See also

 Su böreği

References

External links 

Pasta dishes
Turkish cuisine
Pontic Greek cuisine
Laz cuisine